Scalesia crockeri is a species of flowering plant in the family Asteraceae. It is found only in Ecuador.

References

crockeri
Flora of Ecuador
Vulnerable plants
Taxonomy articles created by Polbot